Kiyotaka (written: 清隆, 清孝, 清高, 聖王 or キヨタカ in katakana) is a masculine Japanese given name. Notable people with the name include:

, Japanese diplomat
, Japanese illustrator
, Japanese handball player
, Japanese botanist
, Japanese footballer
, Japanese actor and singer
, Japanese astronomer
, Japanese serial killer
, Japanese politician and Prime Minister of Japan
, Japanese footballer
, Japanese actor
, Japanese footballer
, Japanese comedian
, Japanese mixed martial artist
, Japanese singer-songwriter
, Japanese director
, Japanese speed skater
, Japanese sumo wrestler
, Japanese sumo wrestler
, Japanese photographer

Fictional characters
Kiyotaka Ishimaru, a character from the visual novel Danganronpa: Trigger Happy Havoc
Kiyotaka Narumi (鳴海), the brother of Ayumu Narumi from the manga and anime series Spiral: The Bonds of Reasoning
Kiyotaka Ayanokouji, the main protagonist from the light novel Classroom of the Elite.

Japanese masculine given names